is a Japanese video game developer that is known for its very unusual and inventive control and gameplay mechanics. The company was founded in March 2001 and is composed of former employees from Human Entertainment.

Games developed

PlayStation 2
2001
 Tekkōki Mikazuki Trial Edition Published by Media Factory only in Japan

2002
 Gigantic Drive Published by Enix, known in North America as Robot Alchemic Drive

2003
 Simple 2000 series Vol. 31: The Chikyū Bōeigun (Earth Defense Force) Published by D3 Publisher, known in Europe as Monster Attack

2004
 Tetsujin 28-go Published by Bandai only in Japan

2005
 Simple 2000 series Vol. 81: The Chikyū Bōeigun 2 (Earth Defense Force 2) Published by D3 Publisher, known in Europe as Global Defence Force

Nintendo DS
2006
  is a mecha video game published by Nintendo only in Japan. Popular Japanese singer and voice actor Ichirou Mizuki sung its song heard in the game's Japanese television commercials and trailer.

 The player uses the stylus to manipulate a Marionation Gear (MG) on the battlefield. MGs are giant mechas that have been developed from marionettes. The touch screen shows a control panel which varies depending on which MG the player is operating. Actions are performed using the touch screen. They include shooting, jumping, swinging a mecha's arm or close-range weapon, changing form, shooting projectiles, etc. There are more than 100 mechas, some of which are able to transform from a vehicle form to a robot form and vice versa, similar to piloted robots from many Japanese television shows.

 The gameplay of Chōsōjū Mecha MG is split into a series of over 120 missions, which can range from defeating enemy robots to winning first place in a race. Outside of battle, MGs can be purchased from various shops, and equipped with status boosting items.

 In the 2008 crossover fighting game, Super Smash Bros. Brawl, 3 Marionation Gears, which are the Warrior Mech Gauss, HM Mech Rosa, and Musketeer Daltania, appear as trophies and stickers. The Beetle-like MG, Ningyou Kouchuu Viigaru, appears only as a sticker in Super Smash Bros. Brawl. A remix titled "Marionation Gear" plays on a stage called Norfair, which is an area from the Metroid series, in Super Smash Bros. Brawl. "Marionation Gear" returns in Super Smash Bros. for Wii U on the same stage. Gauss also appears as a spirit in Super Smash Bros. Ultimate, with the song "Marionation Gear" returning as well, but this time it can only be played in stages not associated to any fighter.

Xbox 360
2006
 Chikyū Bōeigun 3 (Earth Defense Force 3) Published by D3 Publisher, known in North America and Europe as Earth Defense Force 2017

2013
 Chikyū Bōeigun 4 (Earth Defense Force 4) Published by D3 Publisher, known in North America and Europe as Earth Defense Force 2025

Wii
2010
 Zangeki no Reginleiv Published by Nintendo only in Japan

PlayStation Portable
2011
 Chikyū Bōeigun 2 Portable (Earth Defense Force 2 Portable) Published by D3 Publisher only in Japan

PlayStation Vita
2012
 Chikyū Bōeigun 3 Portable (Earth Defense Force 3 Portable) Published by D3 Publisher, known in North America and Europe as Earth Defense Force 2017 Portable

2014
 Chikyū Bōeigun 2 Portable V2 (Earth Defense Force 2 Portable V2) Published by D3 Publisher, known in North America and Europe as Earth Defense Force 2: Invaders from Planet Space

PlayStation 3
2013
 Chikyū Bōeigun 4 (Earth Defense Force 4) Published by D3 Publisher, known in North America and Europe as Earth Defense Force 2025

PlayStation 4
2015
 Chikyū Bōeigun 4.1: The Shadow of New Despair (Earth Defense Force 4.1: The Shadow of New Despair) Published by D3 Publisher

2017
 Chikyū Bōeigun 5 (Earth Defense Force 5) Published by D3 Publisher

Windows
2016
 Chikyū Bōeigun 4.1: The Shadow of New Despair (Earth Defense Force 4.1: The Shadow of New Despair) Published by D3 Publisher

2019
 Chikyū Bōeigun 5 (Earth Defense Force 5) Published by D3 Publisher

Nintendo Switch
2021
 Chikyū Bōeigun 2 (Earth Defense Force 2) Published by D3 Publisher only in Japan
 Chikyū Bōeigun 3 (Earth Defense Force 3) Published by D3 Publisher only in Japan

Notes

References

External links
  
 Sandlot profile at MobyGames
 Sandlot profile at GameFAQs.
 Sandlot profile at IGN.

Japanese companies established in 2001
Video game companies established in 2001
Video game companies of Japan
Video game development companies